Khanata, or Grupo Khanata, is a contemporary Bolivian musical group. 

The Zombie Nations are a very popular Khanata group, playing many contemporary classics.

References

Bolivian musical groups